HD 138289, also known as HR 5757, is a probable spectroscopic binary located in the constellation Apus, the bird-of-paradise. It has an apparent magnitude of 6.18, placing it near the limit for naked eye. At its current distance, HD 138289's brightness is diminished by 0.25 magnitudes due to extinction from interstellar dust. It has an absolute magnitude of +1.21.

The visible component has a stellar classification of K2.5 IIIb CN1.5 Ba+0.5, indicating that it is a red giant with an anomalous overabundance of cyano radicals in its spectrum. The IIIb luminosity class indicates that it is a lower luminosity giant star. The Ba+0.5 suffix states that it is a mild barium star, whose barium abundance might have come from a hidden white dwarf companion. HD 138289 is estimated to be 2.8 billion years old, enough time for it to cool and expand to 13 times the radius of the Sun. It is now on the horizontal branch, fusing helium at its core.

References

K-type giants
PD-77 01134
Apus (constellation)
138289
076664
5757
Apodis, 32
High-proper-motion stars